An icon brand is a symbol-intensive brand that carry powerful universal values making it instantly recognisable thanks to ownable and distinctive codes.

Typical icon brands are luxury brands such as Chanel, Armani or Prada, or globally admired jewellers such as Bulgari, Cartier and Tiffany. 
Fashion brands can become iconic by delivering universal values and iconic elements that allow them to remain successful over time, like Ralph Lauren or Dolce&Gabbana.
The same ability to offer hetero-directed emotional benefits can be associated with only one product (Absolut Vodka) or a product line that insists on a very limited market segment, as in the event of Mini or Vespa. These are "icon products".
Icon brands often come from a position of authority or cult brand, extending the range of products and their popularity outside a restricted circle of followers.
‘Icon Brand’ is also a name of a brand that produces goods for its customers, however despite its name the brand is irrelevant to the marketing term icon brand'.

How brands become icons
Becoming an icon is reaching the top of the marketing world. Icon brands are the most successful, distinctive and famous of the brands. As a result, all brands seek to become icons in order to maximize their sales and reputation however only a few is able to become icons.

Icons are summarised myths and these myths generally evoke the tension between people's individualistic ideas and the prevailing ideology of the society. Examples for icon brand myths include Nike's Air Jordan shoes as they symbolize individual achievement through perseverance and Harley Davidson, which symbolizes rebel bikers. As a consequence of these ideologies, desires to look for a myth start to emerge within people. This results in the creation of myth markets in which brands compete to become icons.

Research shows that if marketed competently, any brand, regardless of its origins and sector can become an icon brand.  Airey, in his book, states that in order to be called an icon, a brand must be simple, relevant, enduring, distinctive, memorable and adaptable. A good brand look and being able to satisfy public demands create attention from the public  and help the brand establish strong and emotional bonds with its customers whereas simplicity makes the brand more memorable for the customer. Although they can endure wear by time, if an ideology shift occurs, the myth of the brand must be reinvented accordingly, in order to protect its status. Logo of the brand must be relevant and distinctive. It must be permanent as it helps to establish a good brand image. For example, Kellogg's’ logo has never changed since 1906, and this has created trust and loyalty for the brand.

Status of a brand should be determined before attempting to develop it into an icon brand. There are two types of brands, as they possess either rational or emotional associations. Emotional brands include icon brands and cult brands. Big and emotional brands such as Nike are icon brands whereas cult brands are the smaller emotional brands. For example, somebody's favorite restaurant is a cult brand for him. On the other hand, rational brands are mass brands and niche brands. Large and rational brands such as Toyota are named as mass brands. A niche brand is the brand, which can be associated with tangible assets or values by a specific group. The Bank of New York can be regarded as an example for this type.

According to Hollis, managers need to take the following five steps before attempting to turn their brands into icons:

1)	Being loyal to the brand's purpose.

2)	Scrutinizing the brand experience that the brand delivers.

3)	Identifying any icon elements in the brand.

4)	Being both authentic and modern at the same time.

5)	Being focused.

Characteristics of icon brands

Icon brands have their own unique characters that differentiate them from other brands. They inspire passion and loyalty. They are not only instantly recognizable but also are admired and meaningful in a way for society. Meaning is very valuable for successful brands it is a way to communicate with the people. An example for this is Coca-Cola's depiction of happiness. By creating this image, Coca-Cola represents a fraction from the lives of its customers and as a result is able to get a powerful response from them.

Iconic brands are successful as they develop powerful identity myths, which are delivered tangibly to make the myth more accessible. These powerful myths address people's desires and anxieties. Myths created by brands (generally through advertisements), lead people to believe that products embody the myth, which are ultimately consumed as those brands are purchased.

In general, icon brands:

1) Focus on national contradictions. - Icons do not differentiate between different segments of consumers; they target the society as a whole through making a connection with national ideology.

2) Employ myths that direct culture – Icons lead pop-culture. They have high market-power because they create myths in order to repair culture when it is necessary. They give existing values new purposes.

3) Sound like a rebel – Icons target those who want to live according to alternative ideals rather than the national ideology in order to create a challenge to the national identity. Their purpose is to understand their point of views and to communicate people like a rebel.

4) Draw on political authority in order to rebuild the myth – Icons do not have a certain identity and as the ideology that surrounds them changes, they have to change and adopt. However, one thing that always stays is their political authority. Even if an icon's myth loses its importance, constituency always expects the icon to be as effective as always since they see icons as trustworthy and committed advocates.

5) Draw on cultural knowledge – Icon brands use culture in order to respond to the needs of customers in an emotional way. 
       
Examples of icon brands:

-   Nike

-	Apple

-	Harley Davidson

-	Oreos

-	Coca-Cola

Why icon brands are more successful

Icon brands are very valuable for consumers as they have a crucial role in the society. A major reason for their success is not the possible services and benefits they can offer in terms of customer satisfaction or technology, but the fact that they have connections with culture. A proof of this is the fact that Coca-Cola and Nike are more popular and loved even than the United States according to a survey. Icon brands’ symbolic meaning is another factor that makes them more successful than the other brands. The symbols in logos such as Harley Davidson's eagle triggers imagination and connects it with ideas and values.

Customer perceptions also favour icon brands, as a research states that icon brands have a higher top-of mind awareness. This shows that iconic brands  are the first brands to come to a customer's mind when they think of a specific product. This familiarity makes the likelihood of purchase higher for icon brands than the other brands. Also if brand is an icon; people do not tend to doubt its quality and prestige.

Differences between brands and icon brands

Icon brands are significantly different than other brands. They are built by different principles than those of conventional marketing, as their first priority is not customer satisfaction. For icon brands, what the brand stands for is more important than the performance of the brand.

The main difference is that brands address rational world whereas icons address emotional world. Brands can also be associated with reliability, value, customer service, price and aesthetics. In contrast with this, icons can be associated with adventure, independence, originality, comfort and nostalgia.

It is often a common mistake to think that identity brand and icon brand to have the same meaning. Identity brands target to facilitate character recognition by connecting to brand personalities. Their personality constantly changes as they aim to reflect societal changes. Examples for identity brands include American Express and Tango. Icon brands, on the other hand, have very strong identities that separate them from identity brands as they target emotions and culture instead.

Iconic brands possess three major features that separate them from other big, well-known brands:

1. Cultural roots that allows them to connect with society's values.

2. They are easily recognizable due to their physical or symbolic features.

3. They have forceful stories and they always manage to remain loyal to their original values.

References

Brand management